San Justo is a municipality in the province of Zamora, part of the autonomous community of Castile and León, Spain. It had a population of 304 in the 2007 census.

See also
 Zamora (province)
 Kingdom of León
 Leonese language

References

Municipalities of the Province of Zamora